Vladimir Ivanovich Morozov  (Sometimes shown as Vladimir Morosov, born 19 June 1952 in Moscow Oblast) was a Soviet sprint canoeist who competed in the late 1970s. He won a gold medal in the K-4 1000 m event at the 1976 Summer Olympics in Montreal, Quebec, Canada.

Morozov also won four medals at the ICF Canoe Sprint World Championships with three golds (K-4 10000 m: 1977, 1978, 1979) and a silver (K-4 1000 m: 1977).

References
 
 
 
 
 Vladimir Morozov II at Olympics at Sports-Reference.com

External links 
 
 
 

1952 births
Living people
Soviet male canoeists
Russian male canoeists
Olympic canoeists of the Soviet Union
Olympic gold medalists for the Soviet Union
Olympic medalists in canoeing
Canoeists at the 1976 Summer Olympics
Medalists at the 1976 Summer Olympics
ICF Canoe Sprint World Championships medalists in kayak
People from Khimki
Sportspeople from Moscow Oblast